Cornish Cowboy is a 2015 short documentary film featuring Dan Wilson, a Cornish-based horse trainer, trained by Monty Roberts. Directed by Gareth Molan and produced by Helen Nash, the film premiered at the 2015 Cannes Film Festival.

Plot 
Based at his ramshackle farm on Bodmin Moor, Cornwall, England, Dan Wilson is a horse trainer, commonly referred to as a 'horse whisperer'. Using his remarkable techniques, Dan breaks in and trains horses where other trainers have tried and failed.

Release
The film premiered during the 2015 Cannes Film Festival and has also been nominated for an award at the 2016 Celtic Media Festival. Amazon released the film in April 2017. In March 2017 a longer version of the film was released titled The Horse Whisperer of Bodmin Moor on Horse and Country TV.

References

External links 
 Official website
 

2015 films
2015 documentary films
Films shot in Cornwall
Films set in Cornwall
2010s English-language films